Last Live in Blue Note Tokyo is the ninth recording released by the New York-based Toshiko Akiyoshi Jazz Orchestra featuring Lew Tabackin.  Not to be confused with the 1997 Toshiko Akiyoshi Trio release, Live at Blue Note Tokyo '97.

Track listing
All songs orchestrated by Toshiko Akiyoshi.  All songs composed by Akiyoshi except "Unrequited Love" (Tabackin).   
 "Lady Liberty" – 12:26   
 "The Village" – 12:20    
 "Unrequited Love" – 11:35 
 "Hiroko's Delight" – 13:08    
 "Chasing After Love" – 10:33 
 "Hope" – 5:21

Personnel
Toshiko Akiyoshi – piano  
Lew Tabackin – tenor saxophone, flute   
Tom Christensen  – tenor saxophone, flute, soprano saxophone   
Dave Pietro – alto saxophone, flute   
Jim Snidero – alto saxophone, flute  
Scott Robinson – baritone saxophone, soprano saxophone     
Mike Ponella – trumpet  
John Eckert – trumpet  
Jim O'Conner – trumpet   
Jim Rotondi – trumpet
Dan Levine – trombone   
Steve Armour – trombone 
Pat Hallaran – trombone  
Tim Newman – bass trombone  
Paul Gill – bass 
Andy Watson – drums

Special Guest  
Terumasa Hino – trumpet

References / External links
Warner Music Japan WPCL-10079 (japanese link)

Toshiko Akiyoshi – Lew Tabackin Big Band albums
2004 live albums